Gaius Julius Hyginus (64 BC – AD 17) was a Latin author, a pupil of the scholar Alexander Polyhistor, and a freedman of Caesar Augustus. He was elected superintendent of the Palatine library by Augustus according to Suetonius' De Grammaticis, 20. It is not clear whether Hyginus was a native of the Iberian Peninsula or of Alexandria.

Suetonius remarks that Hyginus fell into great poverty in his old age and was supported by the historian Clodius Licinus. Hyginus was a voluminous author: his works included topographical and biographical treatises, commentaries on Helvius Cinna and the poems of Virgil, and disquisitions on agriculture and bee-keeping. All these are lost.

Under the name of Hyginus there are extant what are probably two sets of school notes abbreviating his treatises on mythology; one is a collection of Fabulae ("stories"), the other a "Poetical Astronomy".

Fabulae
The Fabulae consists of some three hundred very brief and plainly, even crudely, told myths (such as Agnodice) and celestial genealogies, made by an author who was characterized by his modern editor, H. J. Rose, as adulescentem imperitum, semidoctum, stultum—"an ignorant youth, semi-learned, stupid"—but valuable for the use made of works of Greek writers of tragedy that are now lost. Arthur L. Keith, reviewing H. J. Rose's edition (1934) of Hygini Fabulae, wondered "at the caprices of Fortune who has allowed many of the plays of an Aeschylus, the larger portion of Livy's histories, and other priceless treasures to perish, while this school-boy's exercise has survived to become the pabulum of scholarly effort." Hyginus' compilation represents in primitive form what every educated Roman in the age of the Antonines was expected to know of Greek myth, at the simplest level. The Fabulae are a mine of information today, when so many more nuanced versions of the myths have been lost.

In fact the text of the Fabulae was all but lost: a single surviving manuscript from the abbey of Freising, in a Beneventan script datable c. 900, formed the material for the first printed edition, negligently and uncritically transcribed by Jacob Micyllus, 1535, who may have supplied it with the title we know it by. In the course of printing, following the usual practice, by which the manuscripts printed in the 15th and 16th centuries have rarely survived their treatment at the printshop, the manuscript was pulled apart: only two small fragments of it have turned up, significantly as stiffening in book bindings. Another fragmentary text, dating from the 5th century is in the Vatican Library.

Among Hyginus' sources are the scholia on Apollonius of Rhodes' Argonautica, which were dated to about the time of Tiberius by Apollonius' editor R. Merkel, in the preface to his edition of Apollonius (Leipzig, 1854).

De Astronomica or Poeticon Astronomicon 

De Astronomica was first published, with accompanying figures, by Erhard Ratdolt in Venice, 1482, under the title Clarissimi uiri Hyginii Poeticon astronomicon opus utilissimum. This "Poetic astronomy by the most renowned Hyginus, a most useful work," chiefly tells us the myths connected with the constellations, in versions that are chiefly based on Catasterismi, a work that was traditionally attributed to Eratosthenes.

Like the Fabulae, the Astronomica is a collection of abridgements. According to the Encyclopædia Britannica Eleventh Edition, the style and level of Latin competence and the elementary mistakes (especially in the rendering of the Greek originals) were held to prove that they cannot have been the work of "so distinguished" a scholar as C. Julius Hyginus. It was further suggested that these treatises are an abridgment made in the latter half of the 2nd century of the Genealogiae of Hyginus by an unknown adapter, who added a complete treatise on mythology. The star lists in the Astronomica are in exactly the same order as in Ptolemy's Almagest, reinforcing the idea of a 2nd-century compilation.

Legacy
The lunar crater Hyginus and the minor planet 12155 Hyginus are named after him.

The English author Sir Thomas Browne opens his discourse The Garden of Cyrus (1658) with a Creation myth sourced from the Fabulae of Hyginus.

Notes

References 
 Grant, Mary (transl.), The Myths of Hyginus (Lawrence: University of Kansas Press, 1960).
 Marshall, P.K. (ed.), Hyginus: Fabulae (Munich: Saur, 1993 [corr. ed. 2002]).
 Rose, Herbert Jennings (ed.), Hygini Fabulae (Leiden: A.W. Sijthoff, 1934 [2nd ed. 1963]). The standard text, in Latin.
 Smith, R. Scott & Trzaskoma, Stephen M. (transl.), Apollodorus' Library and Hyginus' Fabulae: Two Handbooks of Greek Mythology (Indianapolis/Cambridge: Hackett Publishing, 2007), .

External links 

 Online Text: Hyginus, Fabulae translated by Mary Grant
 Online Text: Hyginus, Astronomica translated by Mary Grant
 Online Text of Hyginus. excerpted 
 Online Digital copy of the first Latin edition by Jacob Micyllus (Basel, 1535)
 Poeticon Astronomicon, 1482—Full digital facsimile, Linda Hall Library.
 De Mundi et Sphere, 1512—Full digital facsimile, Linda Hall Library.
 Online Galleries, History of Science Collections, University of Oklahoma Libraries—High resolution images of works by Hermes Trismegistus in JPEG and TIFF formats
 Grammaticae Romanae Fragmenta, Gino Funaioli (a cura di), Lipsiae, in aedibus B. G. Teubneri, 1907, vol. 1, pagg. 525 sgg.
 Historicorum Romanorum reliquiae, Hermann Peter (ed.), Lipsiae, in aedibus B. G. Teubneri, vol. 1, 1906, pp. 72–77.

17 deaths
1st-century BC Romans
1st-century BC Latin writers
1st-century Romans
1st-century Latin writers
60s BC births
Ancient Roman astronomers
Ancient Roman writers
Golden Age Latin writers
Hyginus, Gaius
Emperor's slaves and freedmen
Mythographers